In Greek mythology, Adraste (Ancient Greek: Ἀδρήστη) or Adreste may refer to the following:

 Adrasta, also Adrasteia, a daughter of Oceanus and possibly Tethys, thus considered to be one of the Oceanids. Together with her sisters Eidothea and Althaea (Amalthea) were nurses of young Zeus.
 Adraste or Adraste, one of the companions of Helen when Telemachus came to Sparta seeking news of Odysseus. When Helen appeared to greet him, Adraste placed a chair for her, and Alcippe brought a rug of soft wool.

Notes

References 

 Bell, Robert E., Women of Classical Mythology: A Biographical Dictionary. ABC-Clio. 1991. .
 Gaius Julius Hyginus, Fabulae from The Myths of Hyginus translated and edited by Mary Grant. University of Kansas Publications in Humanistic Studies. Online version at the Topos Text Project.
 Homer, The Odyssey with an English Translation by A.T. Murray, Ph.D. in two volumes. Cambridge, MA., Harvard University Press; London, William Heinemann, Ltd. 1919. . Online version at the Perseus Digital Library. Greek text available from the same website.

Oceanids
Women in Greek mythology